Ludowy Zespół Sportowy Kujawy Markowice is a football club from Markowice, Poland. They're currently playing in Liga Okręgowa Cuiavian-Pomeranian Group 2, an A class (seventh level) division within the Polish football league system.

References

Football clubs in Kuyavian-Pomeranian Voivodeship
Mogilno County